New Site Erei was a Belizean football team competing in the Belize Premier Football League (BPFL) of the Football Federation of Belize.

The Team was based in Dangriga.  Their home stadium is Carl Ramos Stadium.

Achievements
Belize Premier League: 3 
 2002/03, 2005/06, 2006

Football clubs in Belize